Palmy Days is a 1931 American Pre-Code musical comedy film written by Eddie Cantor, Morrie Ryskind, and David Freedman, directed by A. Edward Sutherland, and choreographed by Busby Berkeley (who makes a cameo appearance as a fortune teller). The film stars Eddie Cantor. The famed Goldwyn Girls make appearances during elaborate production numbers set in a gymnasium and a bakery ("Glorifying the American Doughnut"). Betty Grable, Paulette Goddard, Virginia Grey, and Toby Wing are among the bevy of chorines. George Raft had an early role.

Plot
Eddie Simpson's family bakery/restaurant grows into a huge success; thanks to Simpsons's entertainment shows and a
fortune-telling booth run by the mysterious Yolando.

When Simpson discovers the fortune-teller is running a racket that cheats people out of their savings; Yolando and his henchman do their best to dispose of him by feeding him into one of the large bakery ovens. However, their efforts fail.

Cast (in credits order)
Charlotte Greenwood as Helen Martin
Barbara Weeks as Joan Clark
Spencer Charters as Mr Clark
Paul Page as Steve
Charles Middleton as Yolando
George Raft as Joe – Yolando's Henchman
Harry Woods as Yolando's Henchman
Eddie Cantor as Eddie Simpson

Music
Cantor's major musical numbers are "My Baby Said Yes, Yes" and "There's Nothing Too Good For My Baby".

Reception
The film was one of the most popular movies of the year.

New York Times movie critic Mordaunt Hall, described Palmy Days as "a more or less funny diatribe" with "two or three inconsequential melodies and a great deal to gaze, including pretty damsels from the Pacific Coast and effectively photographed groups of dancers."

Product placement
Brand-name products rarely appeared in movies of this period, partly because of the campaign against that practice by the motion picture trade periodical Harrison's Reports. In an editorial, that publication reported the on-screen appearance of an Underwood Typewriter and product of Continental Baking Company.

See also
 List of American films of 1931

References

External links
 
 
 

1931 films
1931 musical comedy films
1931 romantic comedy films
American musical comedy films
American romantic comedy films
American romantic musical films
American black-and-white films
Films directed by A. Edward Sutherland
Samuel Goldwyn Productions films
United Artists films
1930s romantic musical films
1930s English-language films
1930s American films
Goldwyn Girls